TurkStream ( or Türk Akımı, ; former name: Turkish Stream) is a natural gas pipeline running from Russia to Turkey. It starts from Russkaya compressor station near Anapa in Russia's Krasnodar Region, crossing the Black Sea to the receiving terminal at Kıyıköy.

Some gas flows onwards to Serbia, and likely in future Hungary. The 2022 Russia–European Union gas dispute cut off deliveries to Bulgaria but they will likely resume with the new Bulgarian government.

History
The first direct gas pipeline between Russia and Turkey under the Black Sea was Blue Stream, which was commissioned in 2005. In 2009, Russia′s prime minister Vladimir Putin proposed the Blue Stream II line parallel to the original pipeline. The Blue Stream II project never took off and the South Stream project took the lead, until it was abandoned in 2014.

The TurkStream (then named Turkish Stream) project was announced by Russia′s president Vladimir Putin on 1 December 2014 during his state visit to Turkey, when a memorandum of understanding was signed between Gazprom and BOTAŞ. A permit for to conduct engineering surveys for the Turkish offshore section was granted in July 2015. Also in July 2015, a memorandum of understanding between Greece and Russia was signed for the construction and operation of the TurkStream section in the Greek territory.

In November 2015, after the shooting down of a Russian Sukhoi Su-24, the project was unilaterally suspended by Russia. In late July 2016, following a reconciliation meeting in Moscow, both sides brought the project back to the table. On 10 October 2016, Russia and Turkey officially signed the intergovernmental agreement in Istanbul to execute the project.

A contract with an offshore contractor Allseas for laying the first line was signed on 8 December 2016 and the contract for the second line was signed on 20 February 2017. Laying of the first line in the Russian offshore section started on 7 May 2017. The ceremony of completing construction of the offshore section was held in Istanbul on 19 November 2018.  The offshore section of the pipeline was filled with gas in November 2019.

Gazprom began shipping gas via TurkStream, including to Bulgaria and North Macedonia, on 1 January 2020, replacing supplies via the Trans-Balkan pipeline through Ukraine and Romania. The pipeline was inaugurated on 8 January 2020 by presidents Putin and Recep Tayyip Erdoğan.

The TurkStream project replaced the South Stream project that was cancelled in 2014. Following the shooting down of a Russian fighter jet by Turkey in November 2015, the project was temporarily halted. Russia–Turkey relations were restored in summer 2016 and the intergovernmental agreement for TurkStream was signed in October 2016. Construction started in May 2017 and gas deliveries to Bulgaria via the pipeline began on 1 January 2020.

Technical features
The pipeline is estimated to cost €11.4 billion. The first line supplies Turkey and the second line transport natural gas further to South East and Central Europe.

Route
TurkStream begins at the Russkaya compressor station near Anapa. The landing point in Turkey is Kıyıköy, a village in the district of Vize in Kırklareli Province at northwestern Turkey. From there, the  section of the first line continues to the distribution center in Lüleburgaz. The  section will connect the Lüleburgaz distribution center with Ipsala on the Turkey–Greece border. Alternatively, the second line will continue from Kıyıköy to Malkoçlar on the Turkey–Bulgaria border, where it will be connected to the existing Trans-Balkan pipeline system.

The further extension of the pipeline in South-East and Central European countries are responsibilities of involved countries. For the gas transport both—existing infrastructure and construction of new pipelines—will be used. For Gazprom the preferable option is to export gas from the second line to Bulgaria, Serbia, Hungary, Slovakia, and Austria. The route in Bulgaria starts on the Bulgaria–Turkey borders and runs by a reverse mode to the compressor station in Provadia, north-east of Bulgaria. From there, a new  pipeline will run to the Bulgaria–Serbia border. New compressor stations will be built in Provadia and Rasovo. The Serbian part of the gas transport route begins near Zaječar on the Bulgaria–Serbia border and cross the Serbia–Hungary border near Horgoš. A connecting branch from Belgrade to Bosnia and Herzegovina is planned.

The other planned follow-on projects included also the Tesla pipeline, to run from Greece to North Macedonia, Serbia and Hungary, ending at the Baumgarten gas hub in Austria.

Contractors
The project was implemented by South Stream Transport B.V., a subsidiary of Gazprom, which was originally established for the South Stream project. In the near-shore areas the offshore pipeline was laid by the pipe-laying vessel Audacia. For the deep part of the Black Sea, the pipe-laying vessel Pioneering Spirit was used.

The contractor for the Turkish section was Petrofac and the subcontractor for the construction of the receiving terminal in Turkey was Tekfen. Contractor for the onshore section to the Turkey–Bulgaria border was TurkAkim Gaz Tasima A. S. will carry out construction of the land section, a joint venture of Gazprom and BOTAŞ.

Impact
TurksStream changes the regional gas flows in South-East Europe by diverting the transit through Ukraine and the Trans Balkan Pipeline system.

See also 

Balkan Stream
Trans Adriatic Pipeline
Trans-Anatolian gas pipeline

References

External links
 
 TurkStream Gas Pipeline on Global Energy Monitor

Natural gas pipelines in Russia
Natural gas pipelines in Turkey
Gazprom pipelines
Russia–Turkey relations
Black Sea energy
Pipelines under the Black Sea
2020 establishments in Russia
2020 establishments in Turkey